The women's 1000 metres race of the 2014–15 ISU Speed Skating World Cup 2, arranged in the Taereung International Ice Rink, in Seoul, South Korea, was held on 23 November 2014.

The race was won by Li Qishi of China, while Marrit Leenstra of the Netherlands in second place, and Karolína Erbanová of the Czech Republic in third place. Laurine van Riessen of the Netherlands won Division B.

Results
The race took place on Sunday, 23 November, with Division B scheduled in the morning session, at 10:30, and Division A scheduled in the afternoon session, at 13:00.

Division A

Division B

References

Women 1000
2
ISU